Uyyale is a 1969 Kannada language romantic drama film directed by N. Lakshminarayan and starring Rajkumar and Kalpana. The film is a direct screen adaptation of the novel of the same name written by the acclaimed novelist Chaduranga (Subramanyaraja Urs). The movie presents a delicate tale of the extra-marital love of a woman neglected by her husband reflecting the social and moral laws of married life.

Besides writing the story, Chaduranga also wrote the dialogues for the film and won Karnataka State Film Award for the year 1979 for this story. The soundtrack and original score composed by Vijaya Bhaskar was widely acclaimed and appreciated. Produced by Gopal - Lakshman duo, the film fetched the Karnataka State Film Award for Best Film award for the same year. The film was screened twice at the IFFI Retrospect - once in 1992 and once again in 2019 on the occasion of the 50th year of IFFI. In a small drama sequence, Rajkumar appears as Gautama Buddha and Leelavathi as Kisa Gotami.

Cast
 Rajkumar as Krishna Gowda
 Kalpana as Radha
 K. S. Ashwath as Seshagiri "Seshu" Rao, Radha's husband and Krishna's friend
 Balakrishna as Seetapathi, Seshu's neighbour
 Ramadevi as Seetha, Seetapathi's wife
 M. Jayashree as Krishna's mother
 Premalatha as Kanaka
 Papamma as Kanaka's mother
 Leelavathi as a stage actor (cameo)
 N. K. Narasimhaiah
 Girija (credited as Baby Girija) as Prabha

Soundtrack
The songs composed by Vijaya Bhaskar and sung by P. B. Sreenivas and P. Susheela found wide reach and are considered one of the best soundtracks. Rajkumar humming a few lines of Doniyolage Neenu in a sequence in the movie remains the only instance of him singing in the music direction of Vijay Bhaskar.

Awards

 Karnataka State Film Awards
 Second Best Film
 Best Story writer - Chaduranga

References

External links
 

1969 films
Indian drama films
Indian black-and-white films
Films based on Indian novels
Films scored by Vijaya Bhaskar
1960s Kannada-language films
1969 drama films
Films directed by N. Lakshminarayan

kn:ಉಯ್ಯಾಲೆ